This is a list of members of the Western Australian Legislative Assembly from 1983 to 1986:

Notes
 At the 1983 election, Labor candidate Gavan Troy won the seat of Mundaring by just 16 votes against the sitting member and Liberal candidate Tom Herzfeld. On 2 September 1983, the Court of Disputed Returns ordered a fresh election, which Troy won on 8 October.
 In 1984, the Liberal member for Subiaco, Dr Tom Dadour, left his party. He served out his term as an independent.
 On 17 August 1984, the Liberal member for Mount Lawley, former Premier Ray O'Connor, resigned. Liberal candidate George Cash won the resulting by-election on 17 November 1984.
 On 31 August 1984, the Labor member for Cockburn, Don Taylor, resigned. Labor candidate Clive Hughes won the resulting by-election on 17 November 1984.
 In 1978, the National Party split from the National Country Party over the coalition question, with the NCP remaining in coalition with the Liberal Party, and the NP occupying the cross-benches. In 1985, the two parties reunited as the National Party of Western Australia, affiliated to the National Party of Australia. However the three former NCP members, unhappy with some of the terms of the reunification, quit the new party and joined the Liberal Party.

Members of Western Australian parliaments by term